Guido Wolf (12 June 1924 – 13 October 1994) was a Liechtenstein sports shooter. He competed in the 50 metre rifle, three positions and 50 metre rifle, prone events at the 1960 Summer Olympics.

References

1924 births
1994 deaths
Liechtenstein male sport shooters
Olympic shooters of Liechtenstein
Shooters at the 1960 Summer Olympics
People from Vaduz